Charles Truman Timmons (February 8, 1917 – March 27, 1996) was an American football fullback in the All-America Football Conference for the Brooklyn Dodgers.  He played college football at the University of Georgia and Clemson College; as a sophomore at the 1940 Cotton Bowl, he rushed for 127 yards and scored the only touchdown in the  

Timmons was selected in the nineteenth round of the 1942 NFL Draft by the Washington Redskins, but instead joined the U.S. Navy.  During training, he played for the Georgia Pre-Flight Skycrackers football team.

References

External links

1917 births
1996 deaths
American football fullbacks
Brooklyn Dodgers (AAFC) players
Clemson Tigers football players
Georgia Pre-Flight Skycrackers football players
People from Piedmont, South Carolina
United States Navy personnel of World War II